This is a list of Thai pop artists and groups.

Thai pop bands 
001 (2003-)
3.2.1 (2010-)
4EVE (2020-)
4MIX (2021-)
7th sense (2018-)
9By9 (2018-)
ALALA (2022-)
ALIZE (2007-)
AR3NA (2021-)
ATLAS (2021-)
B-Mix (2003-)
bamm (2021-)
Bazoo (1998-)
Blackbeans (2018-)
Blueberry Rsiam (2010-)
Boyscout (1993-)
C-Quint (2008-)
Candy Mafia (2009-)
Chilli White Choc (2007-)
Cinderella (2004-)
CmCafe (2018-)
D2B (2001-)
Dragon five (2000-)
Dream II (2005-)
DUST (2018-)
Evo Nine (2013-)
FFK (2007-)
Fever (2018-)
G-Twenty (2009-)
Gaia (2013-)
Giant (1998-)
Girly Berry (2002-)
Hi-Jack (1992-)
Hi-U (2019-)
Kiss Me Five (2010-)
KissBoysTH (2019-)
K-OTIC (2007-)
LAZ1 (2022-)
Nice to meet U (2007-)
Olives (2011-)
PERSES (2022-)
PiXXiE (2021-)
Pretzelle (2020-)
Pop Angels (2005-)
Power Pop Girls (2006-)
Preppy G (2006-) (G-Junior 2 formed by GMM and Training Project collaboration between GMM and Johnny's)
Project H (1999-)
PROXIE (2022-)
RedSpin (2019-)
Rookie BB (2010-)
RoseQuartz (2018-)
Samosorn Chimi (2010-)
Samosorn mini (2016-)
SaoSaoSao (1981-)
SBFIVE (2018-) 
Seven Days (2009-)
Shuu (2013-)
Siam☆Dream (2018-)
Siamese kittenz (2015-)
SIZZY (2019-)
Sugar Eyes (2010-)
Swee:D (2010-)
SY51 (2018-)
TKP (2022-)
T-Skirt (1995-)
TEMPT (2019-)
Three One Six (2016-) 
TRINITY (2019-)
UHT (1994-)
VRP (2014-)
WHO (2014-)
XIS (2010-)
ZaZa (2001-)

Thai pop duos
China Dolls (1999-)
Dept (2018-)
Four-Mod (2005-)
Lift&Oil (1994-)
Neko Jump (2006-)
Two (1991-)
Golf & Mike (2005-) (G-Junior 1 formed by GMM and Training Project collaboration between GMM and Johnny's) 
JR-Voy (1996-)
Raffy-Nancy (1997-)
Raptor (1994-)
Thai pop soloists
Ake Surachet (2005-)
Aof Pongsak (2004-)
Ben chalatit (2005-)
Bird Thongchai (1986-)
BlackJack (2009-)
Boyd Kosiyabong (1994-)
Bright Vachirawit Chivaaree (2019-)
Chinawut Indracusin (2006-) (G-Junior 1 formed by GMM and Training Project collaboration between GMM and Johnny's) 
Christina Aguilar (1990-)
Da Endorphine (2007-)
DDZ (Thai CGI-animated Singer) (2006-)
Gam wichayanee (2008-)
Gena Desouza (2016-)
Grand Kornpassorn (2008-)
Gun Napat (2010-)
Ice Sarunyu (2006-)
Jame ruangsak (1995-)
Jannine Weigel (2010-)
Jeff Satur (2013-)
J jetrin (1991-)  
Joey Boy (1995-)
Katreeya English (1990-)
Keng Tachaya (2011-)
Lanna Commins (2004-)
Lydia Sarunrat (2005-)
Mai Charoenpura (1989-)
Mos patiparn (1993-)
New Jew (2003-)
Nicole Theriault (1998-)
Noey senorita (2004-)
Noona Neungthida (2010-)
Palmy (2001-)
Payu clark (2007-)
Peck Palitchoke (2005-)
Peet peera (2003-)
Pop Pongkool (2006-)
Preaw Kanitkul (1997-)
Stamp (2002-)
Bie The Star (2006-)
TaTaYoung (1991-) 
Thank you Silpchanok (2013-)
Third Lapat (2013-)
Tik Shiro (1987-)
Timethai Plangsilp (2011-)
Tor Saksit (2007-) 
Touch Na Takuathung (1990-)
The Toys (2015-)
Waii Panyarisa (2007-)
Yayaying (1999-)
Thai pop-rock bands 
25 hours (2009-)
AB Normal (2002-)
Armchair (2001-)
Asanee–Wasan (1986-)
Big Ass (1997-)
Black Head (1995-)
Black Vanilla (2006-)
Bodyslam (2002-)
Carabao (1981-)
Clash (2001-)
Cocktail(2002-)
Endorphine (2007-)
Fame (1989-1991,2019-)
Getsunova (2008-)
Hi-Rock (1990-)
Klear (2007-)
La Ong Fong (1996-)
Labanoon (1998-)
Mild (2008-)
Modern Dog (1994-)
Paradox (1996-)
Pause (1996-)
Potato (2001-)
Pru (2001-)
Season five (2009-)
Silly Fools (1996-)
Slot Machine (2004-)
So Cool (2004-)
The Mousses (2007-)
Zeal (2002-)
Thai pop bands of Thai teen music labels (Lukkwad–pop) 
Kəmikəze (2007-) by RS
MBO (2015-) by GMM
Thai pop bands that are franchises of a Japanese brand
BNK48 (2017-) (AKB48's sister group outside Japan)
CGM48 (2019-) (AKB48's sister group outside Japan and sister group of BNK48)
Pop bands that are Thai-Japanese collaborations 
Sweat16 (2017-) (collaboration between LOVEiS Entertainment and Yoshimoto entertainment)
SUMOMO (2019-) (collaboration between Siamdol and UPDANCE ENTERTAINMENT) (FES☆TIVE's sister group outside Japan)
Thai artists who are members of Korean pop groups
BamBam (member of Got7)
Chittaphon Leechaiyapornkul (member of NCT)
Minnie (singer) (member of (G)I-dle)
Pranpriya Manobal (member of Blackpink)

See also
Thai pop music
Music of Thailand

References 

Thai pop artists
Thai popular music